Quercus toumeyi, the Toumey oak, is a North American a species of tree in the beech family. It is found in northwestern Mexico and the southwestern United States. It grows in Sonora, Chihuahua, Arizona, New Mexico, and the extreme westernmost tip of Texas (Franklin Mountains north of El Paso).

Quercus toumeyi is a deciduous or subevergreen shrub or small tree. The bark is dark gray, almost black.

References

External links
 photo of herbarium specimen at Missouri Botanical Garden, collected in Arizona in 1894

toumeyi
Flora of Arizona
Flora of New Mexico
Flora of Sonora
Least concern flora of North America
Plants described in 1895
Taxonomy articles created by Polbot
Flora of the Sierra Madre Occidental